Stade TP Mazembe is a multi-use stadium located in the Kamalondo suburb of Lubumbashi, Democratic Republic of the Congo.  Since its completion in 2011, it has mostly been used for football matches and is the home venue of TP Mazembe and CS Don Bosco. The stadium has 18,000 seats.

History
In April 2010 the construction of the new stadium of the TP Mazembe Lubumbashi club began, an enclosure that will meet the standards required by the African Football Confederation (CAF) to host international competitions, the new facilities have a VIP press room, parking for vehicles and synthetic grass.

Until 2011 the TP Mazembe made use of the Stade Frederic Kibassa Maliba.

Matches at African Competitions

References

External links
Video of new stadium
Démarrage des travaux de construction du nouveau stade du TP Mazembe, à Lubumbashi (French) April 30, 2010
Stadium under construction image
Stade du TP Mazembe Soccerway Profile

Football venues in the Democratic Republic of the Congo
Sport in Lubumbashi
Lubumbashi
TP Mazembe
CS Don Bosco
2011 establishments in the Democratic Republic of the Congo
Sports venues completed in 2011